Dyodyo Asema is a collaborative EP by Alkerdeel and Gnaw Their Tongues, released on January 13, 2014 by ConSouling Sounds.

Track listing

Personnel
Adapted from the Dyodyo Asema liner notes.
Musicians
 Lord QW – bass guitar
 Maurice de Jong (as Mories) – vocals, instruments, mixing, mastering
 Pede – vocals
 Pui – guitar
 Nieke – drums
Additional personnel
Luchtrat – illustrations, design

Release history

References

External links 
 
 Dyodyo Asema at Bandcamp

2014 EPs
Collaborative albums
Gnaw Their Tongues albums